Sadská is a town in Nymburk District in the Central Bohemian Region of the Czech Republic. It has about 3,200 inhabitants.

Geography

It lies in the Central Elbe Table lowland within the Polabí region. The Šembera River flows southeast of the town, and the Elbe forms short part of the northern municipal border. In the northern part of the territory there is Sadská Lake, which was created by flooding a sand quarry.

History
The first written mention of Sadská is in the foundation document of the Břevnov Monastery from 993. A royal castle was built on a hill above the town to protect the country road. In 1118–1120, Duke Bořivoj II had built the Church of Saint Apollinaris with a chapter. Until the mid-13th century, monarchs used to go to Sadská for entertainment and hunting. In 1262, the seat was moved to Poděbrady, only the chapter remained. A hundred years later, Charles IV transferred the chapter to New Town of Prague, and the golden times of Sadská came to an end.

A convent was founded here, but it was burned down during the Hussite Wars. A new propsperity began in 1562, when Sadská was promoted to a market town by Ferdinand I. During the 17th century, the castle disappeared as a result of the Thirty Years' War and several large fires. In 1784, Sadská was promoted to a town by Joseph II.

Demographics

Transport
The D11 motorway runs south of the town.

Sights

The landmark of the town is the Church of Saint Appolinaris on a hill above the town. It was rebuilt to its current form by Kilian Ignaz Dientzenhofer in 1737–1739, and modified in 1894–1895.

The Chapel of Our Lady of Sorrows was built next to a spring of healing water in 1714–1721, and probably was also rebuilt by Dientzenhofer.

The Baroque bell tower dates from 1691. Originally it was a clock tower.

Notable people
Franz Xaver Niemetschek (1766–1849), philosopher and music critic
Václav Marek (1908–1994), writer, traveller, publicist and researcher

References

External links

Cities and towns in the Czech Republic
Populated places in Nymburk District